Chomden Rigpe Raldri (1227–1305) was an important scholar of the Sakya school, who was involved in the editing of the Tibetan canon. He wrote an early work on spelling (dag yig). He was born in Phu thang in Lho-kha and spent most of his career at Snar thang monastery.

References

Tibetan people
1227 births
1305 deaths